The Church of Nigeria is the Anglican church in Nigeria. It is the second-largest province in the Anglican Communion, as measured by baptised membership (not by attendance), after the Church of England.  it gives its membership as "over 18 million", out of a total Nigerian population of 190 million. It is "effectively the largest province in the Communion." As measured by active membership, the Church of Nigeria has nearly 2 million active baptised members. According to a study published by Cambridge University Press in the Journal of Anglican Studies, there are between 4.94 and 11.74 million Anglicans in Nigeria. The Church of Nigeria is the largest Anglican province on the continent of Africa, accounting for 41.7% of Anglicans in Sub-Saharan Africa, and is "probably the first [largest within the Anglican Communion] in terms of active members."

Since 2002 the Church of Nigeria has been organised into 14 ecclesiastical provinces. It has rapidly increased the number of its dioceses and bishops from 91 in 2002 to 161 as at January 2013. The administrative headquarters are located in Abuja. Its primate is Archbishop Henry Ndukuba.

History

Christianity came to Nigeria in the 15th century through Augustinian and Capuchin monks from Portugal. The first mission of the Church of England was, though, only established in 1842 in Badagry by Henry Townsend. In 1864 Samuel Ajayi Crowther, an ethnic Yoruba and former slave, was elected Bishop of the Niger and the first black Bishop of the Anglican Communion. Lagos became a diocese of its own in 1919.

Leslie Gordon Vining became Bishop of Lagos in 1940 and in 1951 the first archbishop of the newly inaugurated Province of West Africa. Vining was the last Bishop of Lagos of European descent.

On 24 February 1979, the sixteen dioceses of Nigeria were joined in the Church of Nigeria, a newly founded province of the Anglican Communion, with Timothy O. Olufosoye, then Bishop of Ibadan, becoming its first archbishop, primate and metropolitan. Between 1980 and 1988, eight additional dioceses were created. In 1986, he was succeeded by J. Abiodun Adetiloye who became the second primate and metropolitan of Nigeria, a position he would hold until 1999.

In 1989 the Diocese of Abuja was created on the area of the new capital of Nigeria with Peter Akinola as first bishop.

The 1990s was the decade of evangelization for the Church of Nigeria, starting with the consecration of mission bishops for the mission dioceses of Minna, Kafanchan, Katsina, Sokoto, Makurdi, Yola, Maiduguri, Bauchi, Egbado and Ife. Between 1993 and 1996 the primate founded nine dioceses; Oke-Osun, Sabongidda-Ora, Okigwe North, Okigwe South, Ikale-Ilaje, Kabba, Nnewi, Egbu and Niger Delta North. In December 1996 five more mission dioceses were added in the north — Kebbi, Dutse, Damaturu, Jalingo and Otukpo — and their respective first bishops elected. In 1997 and 1998 four more dioceses were established; Wusasa, Abakaliki, Ughelli and Ibadan North. In 1999 the Church of Nigeria added 13 new dioceses; four in July (Oji River, Ideato, Ibadan South and Offa), eight in November (Lagos West, Ekiti West, Gusau, Gombe, Niger Delta West, Gwagwalada, Lafia and Bida) and Oleh in December. So within 10 years there were 27 new regular dioceses and 15 mission dioceses created. The Archbishop of Canterbury declared the Church of Nigeria to be the fastest growing church in the Anglican Communion.

In 1997 the Church of Nigeria was split into three ecclesiastical provinces (see below).

In 2000, Archbishop Peter Akinola succeeded Archbishop Adetiloye as primate of the Church of Nigeria. One of his first actions as primate was to get together 400 bishops, priests, lay members and members of the Mothers' Union to elaborate a vision for the Church of Nigeria under the chairmanship of Ernest Shonekan, a former President of Nigeria. The vision elaborated was:
The Church of Nigeria (Anglican Communion) shall be; Bible-based, spiritually dynamic, united, disciplined, self supporting, committed to pragmatic evangelism, social welfare and a Church that epitomizes the genuine love of Christ.

The program of action included among others additional translations of the liturgy, establishing a lay fundraising team, establishing a legal support to ensure freedom of religion and worship, establishing theological colleges and universities, internet access for all dioceses, training evangelists, priests and their wives, social welfare programs, hospitals, secondary schools, literacy courses and setting up cottage industries.

In 2005, as one of the goals of the Vision of the Church of Nigeria, the church-owned Ajayi Crowther University in Oyo was granted license to operate as a private university in Nigeria on 7 January 2005.

Structure and leadership

In 1997, as a result of rapid expansion, the Church of Nigeria was split into three internal ecclesiastical provinces:
 Province 1, consisting of the dioceses in the West, headed by Archbishop Joseph Abiodun Adetiloye, who remained Primate of All Nigeria, and metropolitan archbishop.
 Province 2, consisting of the Eastern dioceses, headed by Benjamin Nwankiti, Bishop of Owerri as metropolitan archbishop.
 Province 3, consisting of the Northern dioceses, headed by Peter Akinola, Bishop of Abuja, as metropolitan archbishop.

In 2002 the Church of Nigeria was again reorganised, this time into 10 ecclesiastical provinces.

The rapid expansion has continued, and as of 2012 there are 14 archbishops, heading 14 ecclesiastical provinces, with a total of 161 dioceses.

The fourteen ecclesiastical provinces presently are:
Aba - (Archbishop: Isaac Chijioke Nwaobia)
Abuja - (Archbishop: Henry Ndukuba)
Bendel -  (Archbishop: Cyril Odutemu)
Enugu - (Archbishop: Emmanuel Chukwuma)
Ibadan - (Archbishop: Segun Okubadejo)
Jos - (Archbishop: Markus Ibrahim)
Kaduna - (Archbishop: Ali Buba Lamido)
Kwara - (Archbishop: Israel Amoo)
Lagos - (Archbishop: Humphrey Bamisebi Olumakaiye)
Lokoja - (Archbishop: Daniel Abubakar Yisa)
Niger - (Archbishop: Alex Ibezim)
Niger Delta - (Archbishop: Tunde Adeleye)
Ondo - (Archbishop: Christopher Tayo Omotunde)
Owerri - (Archbishop: David Onuoha)

Primate

The fourteen archbishops each hold metropolitical authority within their respective provinces. One of them is additionally the Primate and bears the title "Primate of All Nigeria". The primates of the Church of Nigeria have been:

Anglican realignment
The Church of Nigeria has continuously opposed the liberal inclinations of the Episcopal Church of the United States and the Anglican Church of Canada, which led to the acceptance of non-celibate homosexuality and non-celibate homosexual clergy. The church has also opposed the decisions made by the Church of England to accept celibate same-sex relationships and clergy in celibate same-sex relationships, including civil unions. The former primate, Peter Akinola, become prominent as a leader of conservatives within the Anglican Communion. After the ordination of a partnered gay man, Gene Robinson, as a bishop of the Diocese of New Hampshire, in the United States, he threatened that it was a measure that could split the Anglican Communion. As a first step, the church declared itself in "impaired communion" with the Episcopal Church USA on 21 November 2003. In September 2005 the Church of Nigeria reworded its constitution to redefine, from its point of view, the Anglican Communion, no longer as "Provinces in communion with the See of Canterbury" but instead "all Anglican Churches, Dioceses and Provinces that hold and maintain the ‘Historic Faith, Doctrine, Sacrament and Discipline of the one Holy, Catholic, and Apostolic Church'." Also in 2005, Archbishop Akinola criticised the Church of England for allowing clergy in same-sex civil partnerships saying that "[it] proposes same-sex marriage ‘in everything but name’ and that the proposal to extract a promise from gay clergy who register for civil unions to abstain from sexual relations is ‘totally unworkable’ and 'invites deception and ridicule'." In 2021, Archbishop Ndukuba reiterated the church's opposition to actions within the churches of "The Episcopal Church of the USA, Canada, [and the] UK..." and his commitment to GAFCON.

On November 12, 2005, the church entered into a "Covenant of Concordat" with the Reformed Episcopal Church and the Anglican Province of America, two conservative groups of Anglican origin but outside the Anglican Communion, which do not recognize the Episcopal Church USA. In October and December 2006, several Episcopal churches in Virginia declared themselves out of communion with the Episcopal Church USA due to their opposition to their stance on homosexuality and joined the Church of Nigeria through the Convocation of Anglicans in North America, a mission originally started by the Church of Nigeria to support Nigerian Anglicans in the United States. It now mostly consists of non-Nigerian, theologically conservative American Anglicans, and initially began under the oversight of two bishops; Bishop Martyn Minns and a suffragan bishop, David Bena, who are simultaneously bishops of the Church of Nigeria. The Church of Nigeria is currently in full communion with the Anglican Church in North America, founded in June 2009, launched as a conservative alternative to the liberal tendencies of the Episcopal Church of the United States and the Anglican Church of Canada. The first of four new American dioceses for the ACNA established by the Church of Nigeria, under the oversight of the missionary bishop of CANA, was the Missionary Diocese of the Trinity which was inaugurated on 19 August 2012 by Archbishop Nicholas Okoh. Now reconstituted as the Church of Nigeria North American Mission, CONNAM consists of two U.S. dioceses primarily composed of Nigerian immigrants. In 2022, conflict emerged between the ACNA and the Church of Nigeria as a bishop from the Church of Nigeria led a mob and reportedly attacked members of the ACNA congregation.

The Church of Nigeria took a 470 members delegation, led by Archbishop Nicholas Okoh and including several archbishops and bishops to the GAFCON II, that took place from 21 to 26 October 2013, in Nairobi, Kenya.

The Church of Nigeria was represented at GAFCON III, held in Jerusalem, on 17–22 June 2018, by a 472 members delegation, the largest from any Anglican province.

Ordination of women 
The Church of Nigeria does not recognise the ordination of women to the priesthood or the episcopate. In 2010, then Archbishop Nicholas Oko permitted the ordination of women to the diaconate within limitations.

Ecumenical relations
In October 2009, the Nigerian church's leadership reacted to the Vatican's proposed creation of personal ordinariates for disaffected traditionalist Anglicans by saying that although it welcomed ecumenical dialogue and shared moral theology with the Roman Catholic Church, the current GAFCON structures already meet the spiritual and pastoral needs of conservative Anglicans in Africa.

See also
List of the largest Protestant bodies

References

External links

 

 
Nigeria
Anglican realignment
Anglicanism in Nigeria
Nigeria
Nigeria
Christian organizations established in 1979
Nigeria
Christian denominations established in the 20th century